Tom Austin (born 7 December 2000), better known by his stage name Niko B (short for Niko Bellic), is an English rapper from Newport Pagnell, Buckinghamshire. He is best known for his single "Who's That What's That".

Career 
Austin's stage name is a reference to Niko Bellic, the protagonist of Grand Theft Auto IV.

He began by releasing his first single, "Mary Berry",  with lyrics focusing around life in small-town Britain. This song's popularity gave him the chance to tour with rappers K.O and V9. In an interview with Clash, Austin says he vomited before every performance, and technical issues during the first show meant he instead sang happy birthday to a girl in the front row. His most popular single, "Who's That What's That" was released in May 2020. It became a top 40 hit in the UK, and peaked at No. 26 on the UK Singles Chart. The song's success was boosted by viral marketing on social media platforms Instagram and TikTok.

Niko runs his own clothing label, CROWD, which is often featured in his music videos.

In 2021 Niko B played The 1Xtra Dance stage at the Reading and Leeds Festivals and released two new singles: "International Baby" and "It's All Gone".

In 2022, he released four new singles, these being "I Had a Fist Fight with an Emo outside Subway", "Canada Goose", "Love Island Freestyle" and "Rips In Jeans". "Rips In Jeans" went on to feature in the video game FIFA 23.

Musical style 
Niko B covers multiple genres, with "nothing off limits in terms of style." For example, in an interview with Vogue, Austin said he wanted to have his own style with his lyrics, for example referencing removing a gherkin from a McDonalds Big Mac burger, written to be relatable to young British people but also unique to him. Media outlets have consistently praised his lyrical storytelling, often comparing him to Mike Skinner of The Streets. Reviewers have also emphasised his hook writing and individual approach to the vocal style of rap.

Discography

Singles

References 

2000 births
English hip hop musicians
Male hip hop musicians
Male rappers
Musicians from Buckinghamshire
People from Milton Keynes
People from Newport Pagnell
Living people
English comedy musicians
Comedy-related YouTube channels
English YouTubers
Music YouTubers